Thomas Burton OFM, (died 1458) was a pre-Reformation prelate who served as the Bishop of Sodor and Man from 1455 to 1458.

A Franciscan friar, he was appointed bishop of the Diocese of Sodor and Man on 21 June or 25 September 1455. He held the see for two and a half years and died in office after 18 February 1458.

References 

 
 
 
 
 

1458 deaths
English Friars Minor
15th-century English Roman Catholic bishops
Bishops of Sodor and Man
Franciscan bishops
Year of birth unknown